SVI may refer to:

 Scientific Volume Imaging, developers of the Huygens Software; a multi-platform image-deconvolution, -analysis, and -visualization software package for 2D and 3D microscopy.
 Settleability Volume Index or sludge volume index (SVI): the volume in millimeters occupied by 1 g of activated sludge after  aerated liquid has settled for 30 minutes
 Siddhartha Vanasthali Institute, a school in Nepal
 Southern Railway of Vancouver Island
 Spectravideo, computer and video-game manufacturer
 Strayer Voigt Inc, manufacturer of M1911-styled modular pistols
 Sviatoslav Mykhailiuk, Ukrainian basketball player nicknamed "Svi"
 
 System Volume Information (in Microsoft Windows file-systems)